By-elections for Strakonice and Brno-City District Senate seats were held in the Czech Republic in October and November 2003. Election in Strakonice was held on 30 October-1 November and 7–8 November. Election in Brno-City was held on 7–8 November and 14–15 November. Elections were won by Josef Kalbáč in Strakonice and by Karel Jarůšek in Brno-City. Elections were held after incumbent Senators were appointed Judges of Constitutional Court of the Czech Republic.

Strakonice

Main candidates were Pavel Pavel and Josef Kalbáč who faced each other in second round. Kalbáč won the second round.

Brno-City

Candidates included football manager Karel Jarůšek, Brno Councillor Rostislav Slavotínek, Minister of Health Marie Součková, Daniel Borecký and Journalist Petr Cibulka. Karel Jarůšek won the election when he defeated Rostislav Slavotínek in the second round. Minister Součková was eliminated in the first round when she received only 7.5% of votes which she blamed on strong campaign against her.

References

2003 elections in the Czech Republic
2003